James Hogg (16 October 1906 – 2 December 1975) was an Australian cricketer. He played nine first-class matches for New South Wales and Queensland between 1926/27 and 1931/32.

See also
 List of New South Wales representative cricketers
 List of Queensland first-class cricketers

References

External links
 

1906 births
1975 deaths
Australian cricketers
New South Wales cricketers
Queensland cricketers
People from Goulburn
Cricketers from New South Wales